Miss Brazil 2015, officially Miss Brazil Be Emotion 2015, was the 61st edition of the Miss Brazil pageant. It was held on 18 November 2015 at Citibank Hall in São Paulo, and was hosted by Cássio Reis and Mariana Weickert. Melissa Gurgel of Ceará crowned her successor Marthina Brandt of Rio Grande do Sul at the end of the event. Brandt represented Brazil at the Miss Universe 2015 pageant and placed in the Top 15.

Results

Special Awards

Contestants

References

External links
Official Miss Brasil Website
Miss Brasil 2015 Full Show (in Brazilian Portuguese)

2015
2015 in Brazil
2015 beauty pageants